Cooksville is an unincorporated community in Howard County, Maryland, United States. As of 2016, the population was 631. The town was founded by Thomas Cook in 1802.  The crossroads town was anchored by the Joshua Roberts Tavern, where General Lafayette visited in 1824. The inn was destroyed by fire, rebuilt, and demolished a second time. Thomas Cook exchanged his stake in Cooksville with Thomas Beale Dorsey for the 231-acre Round About Hills slave plantation. A Post Office opened on the 4th of July 1851, the same year Howard County was formed from a portion of Anne Arundel County. Roberts Inn was listed on the National Register of Historic Places in 1973.

On June 29, 1863, J. E. B. Stuart marched 5000 confederate soldiers through Cooksville en route to Westminster.

See also
Inwood, Maryland
Shipley's Adventure (Cooksville, Maryland)
Sarah Jane Powell Log Cabin
Poverty Discovered
Lost By Neglect - Pleasant Valley
Red House Tavern

References

 
Unincorporated communities in Howard County, Maryland
Unincorporated communities in Maryland